Joseph Bracket Spruill (September 23, 1906 – November 1973) was an American Negro league pitcher in the 1920s.

A native of Elizabeth City, North Carolina, Spruill attended Atlanta University and played for the Lincoln Giants in 1927. He died in Schenectady, New York in 1973 at age 66.

References

External links
 and Seamheads

1906 births
1973 deaths
Date of death missing
Lincoln Giants players
Baseball pitchers
Baseball players from North Carolina
People from Elizabeth City, North Carolina
20th-century African-American sportspeople